Travel Express is a bus company based in Wolverhampton, West Midlands, England.

History
Travel Express was founded in 2000 by Kishan Singh Chumber. Initially, the company ran services in Birmingham before switching operations to Wolverhampton.

Services
Travel Express currently operate six services around Wolverhampton including Transport for West Midlands tendered services 63, 64, 65 and 303 to Willenhall

Fleet
The current fleet consists of Alexander Dennis Enviro200s, they previously had a number of Dennis Darts in the fleet but these have since departed.

Criticism
The company came under fire in January 2015 following a public enquiry by Traffic Commissioner Nick Jones, with the investigation finding that buses were unsafe and dirty, basic safety principles were unmet and that the company employed no cleaner, whilst branding manager Kishan Chumber 'incompetent'. Chumber responded, stating that the results of the public enquiry were a "gross vilification of the business" and that Travel Express were being unfairly targeted. The company had its number of allowed buses reduced from 13 to 8, and its routes reduced from 4 to 2.  In September 2015, the company's licence was revoked for failing to comply with requirements imposed by the Traffic Commissioner.

In 2016, Travel Express, now trading as ‘Let’s Go’ received a new licence to operate 8 vehicles, under three conditions:  
 The company employ a full-time transport manager,
 The company employ a full time mechanic,
 Mr Chumber has no role in vehicle maintenance.

In 2018, Travel Express' owner, Kishan Singh Chumber, applied to be re-instated as a Transport Manager for the company.  At the January 2018 Traffic Commission meeting, he withdrew his application.

See also
List of bus operators of the United Kingdom

References

Transport companies established in 2001
Bus operators in the West Midlands (county)
Bus transport in the West Midlands (county)
British companies established in 2001